Heliopolis (1936–1959) was a British thoroughbred racehorse and Champion sire.

Background
Heliopolis was bred and raced by Edward Stanley, 17th Earl of Derby. As a son of Hyperion and Drift he was a full brother to the double British classic winner Sun Stream.

Racing career
He was raced from age two to four and then exported during World War II to the Coldstream Stud of E. Dale Shaffer in Lexington, Kentucky and arrived at the port of New York on August 10, 1941. After limited and less than successful racing on dirt, he was sent to stand at his owner's stud.

Stud record
A sire of Champions, Heliopolis was the Leading sire in North America in 1950 and 1954. Among his best progeny were three American Champion Three-Year-Old Fillys, Grecian Queen (1953), Parlo (1954), and Berlo (1960). Parlo also earned the American Champion Older Female Horse title in 1954 and 1955. He was the sire of the very good runner and sire of Champions, Summer Tan. His other successful sons include Ace Admiral, Greek Ship, High Gun, the 1954 American Champion Three-Year-Old Male Horse and 1955 American Champion Older Male Horse, and the top caliber sprinter Olympia who became a foundation sire for Florida breeder, Fred W. Hooper. Heliopolis is the grandsire of Greek Song, Pia Star, and Pucker Up.

Heliopolis was the damsire of the 1968 Kentucky Derby winner, Forward Pass, of All Beautiful, the 1969 Kentucky Broodmare of the Year as well as Iberia who earned Kentucky Broodmare honors in 1971 and who was the dam of 1972 Kentucky Derby and Belmont Stakes winner, Hall of Fame inductee, Riva Ridge. Heliopolis was also the damsire of Marshua.

E. Dale Shaffer sold Coldstream Stud along with Heliopolis in 1951 to Henry Knight who then syndicated the stallion after which he was moved to Almahurst Farm in Nicholasville, Kentucky.

An aging Heliopolis suffered from laminitis and in 1959 the twenty-three-year-old horse was humanely euthanized.

Pedigree

Heliopolis was inbred 4S x 3D to Canterbury Pilgrim, meaning this mare appears in the fourth generation of the sire's side of the pedigree and in the third generation of the dam's side. Heliopolis is also inbred 4S x 4D to St. Simon, with two more crosses to St. Simon in the fifth generation.

References

 Heliopolis' pedigree and partial racing stats

1936 racehorse births
1959 racehorse deaths
Racehorses bred in the United Kingdom
Racehorses trained in the United Kingdom
Racehorses trained in the United States
United States Champion Thoroughbred Sires
Thoroughbred family 8-g
Chefs-de-Race